The Zhouzai Wetland Park is a wetland in Zuoying District, Kaohsiung, Taiwan.

Ecology
The wetland serves as a place for various birds and aquatic plants.

Facilities
The wetland features bird-watching classroom and viewing platforms.

Transportation
The wetland is accessible within walking distance west of Ecological District Station of Kaohsiung Metro.

References

Landforms of Kaohsiung
Tourist attractions in Kaohsiung
Wetlands of Taiwan
Zuoying District